Jill York (born October 21, 1966) is an American politician and a former Republican member of the Kentucky House of Representatives. York represented District 96 after winning the December 2009 Special election to fill the vacancy caused by the election of Representative Robin L. Webb to the Kentucky Senate. She served from December 2009 to January 2019.

Education
York attended Marshall University, Marshall University's W. Page Pitt School of Journalism and Mass Communications, and Transylvania University.

Elections
2018: York was defeated by Democrat Kathy Hinkle.
2012 York was unopposed for both the May 22, 2012 Republican Primary and the November 6, 2012 General election, winning with 10,024 votes.
2009 When District 96 Democratic Representative Webb ran for the remainder of an unexpired Kentucky Senate term, York won the 2009 Special election with 2,545 votes (60.5%) against Democratic nominee Barry Webb.
2010 York won the May 18, 2010 Republican Primary with 3,488 votes (66.5%) and won the November 2, 2010 General election with 6,954 votes (58.2%) against Democratic nominee David Hayes.

References

External links
Official page  at the Kentucky General Assembly
Campaign site

Jill York at Ballotpedia
Jill York at the National Institute on Money in State Politics

Place of birth missing (living people)
1966 births
Living people
Marshall University alumni
Republican Party members of the Kentucky House of Representatives
People from Grayson, Kentucky
Transylvania University alumni
Women state legislators in Kentucky
21st-century American politicians
21st-century American women politicians